The 1974 United States House of Representatives election in Georgia's 6th congressional district was the election for the Representative of Georgia's 6th district to the United States House of Representatives which was held on November 4, 1974. This election is notable for being the beginning of a political career of a then-little known professor from the University of West Georgia and future Speaker of the United States House of Representatives Newt Gingrich.

Incumbent Representative John J. Flynt in his previous nine runs had never faced any serious challenge, winning re-election in 1972 without any formal opposition. However, in 1974, he was nearly defeated by political newcomer Newt Gingrich. This came as a considerable surprise. Flynt was known as one of the most conservative Democrats in the House, and 1974 was a very poor year for Republicans nationally due to fallout from Watergate. Gingrich would face Flynt in another close race in 1976, but come short again. Flynt would retire in 1978 rather than fight another close match (and possibly unsuccessful re-election bid) with Gingrich, thus finally giving Republicans a victory in a district that had not elected a Republican to the House of Representatives since Reconstruction.

See also
United States House of Representatives elections, 1974

References

Georgia
1974
Newt Gingrich
1974 Georgia (U.S. state) elections